The Challengers is a 1990 family television film that was produced by Lauron Productions for CBC Television. It stars Gema Zamprogna (best known for her role on Road to Avonlea), Gwynyth Walsh and Eric Christmas. The film features the Jon and Vangelis song "I'll Find My Way Home".

The film was first broadcast in Canada on 14 October 1990 through CBC Television. BBC One aired the film in the United Kingdom on 3 August 1993. The film also had frequent showings on The Disney Channel. Triboro Entertainment provided the video release on VHS.

It was shot in Winnipeg and Stonewall, Manitoba.

Plot
After her father dies, Mackie and her mom move to a new town. As she makes new friends, she discovers  a band she wants to join. The only problem is, the band consists of only boys and no girls are allowed. She comes up with the idea to dress like a boy to join the band and be part of "The Challengers". Balancing out between dressing up as a guy in the band and a being normal girl with her best friend Jenny is harder than she thought.

Cast

See also
 Road to Avonlea

References

External links

CBC Television original films
Canadian children's drama films
1990 drama films
1990 television films
1990 films
English-language Canadian films
Films directed by Eric Till
Films scored by Eric Robertson (composer)
Canadian drama television films
1990s English-language films
1990s Canadian films